Squash competitions at the 2015 Pan American Games in Toronto were held from July 11 to 17. The venue for the competitions was Direct Energy Centre (Exhibition Centre), due to naming rights the venue were known as the latter for the duration of the games. A total of six events were contested (three each for men and women).

Competition schedule

The following is the competition schedule for the squash competitions:

Medal table

Medalists

Men's events

Women's events

Participating nations
A total of 13 countries qualified athletes. The number of athletes a nation entered is in parentheses beside the name of the country.

Qualification

A total of 56 athletes qualified to compete at the Games (32 male, 24 female). Each country was allowed to enter a maximum of three male and three female athletes. The top ten men's teams and top eight women's teams (including Canada) at the 2014 Pan American Sports Festival qualified the games. A further two wildcards were allocated (2 men). A nation may enter a maximum of two athletes per singles events, and one doubles per event.

References

 
Events at the 2015 Pan American Games
Pan American Games
2015
Squash in Canada